Valery Sedoc (born 4 September 1985) is a Dutch former professional footballer. He most notably played for Eredivisie club Groningen between 2003 and 2006, making 7 appearances.

Career
Sedoc grew up in a family of athletes. His father Roy Sedoc is a Dutch former athlete who became multiple Dutch champion in the long jump and triple jump disciplines. His brothers Gregory, Jermaine, Randy are also athletes.

Sedoc played professionally for Groningen where he made his debut on 9 May 2004 in a 2–0 away loss to Utrecht. Before that he played in the youth academies of Omniworld and Ajax. He played a total of seven Eredivisie matches at Groningen in three seasons, struggling to gain playing time due to being a backup to Groningen key player, Bruno Silva. 

After his professional career ended he played for a number of amateur clubs. First a season with Hoofdklasse club Harkemase Boys before moving to Velocitas, where he played until 2014.

Sedoc later became a youth coach, and established the Sedoc Voetbalschool in Groningen.

References

1985 births
Living people
Dutch footballers
Footballers from Amsterdam
FC Groningen players
Eredivisie players
Association football defenders
Amsterdamsche FC players
AFC Ajax players
Almere City FC players
Harkemase Boys players